Philosophy, Ethics, and a Common Humanity: Essays in Honour of Raimond Gaita is a 2011 book edited by Christopher Cordner, honoring the work of Raimond Gaita.

Contributors
 Lars Hertzberg 
 Stephen Mulhall
 Jonathan Glover 
 Christopher Cordner 
 Antony Duff 
 Marina Barabas 
 Avishai Margalit
 Martin Krygier
 Robert Manne
 M.M. McCabe
 Genevieve Lloyd 
 Peter Coghlan 
 Nick Drake 
 Peter Steele

References

External links 
 Philosophy, Ethics, and a Common Humanity: Essays in Honour of Raimond Gaita

2011 non-fiction books
Routledge books
Festschrifts